Otta is a river in Innlandet county, Norway. The  river flows through the Ottadalen valley which includes the municipalities of Skjåk, Lom, Vågå, and Sel. The watershed of the Otta drains an area of  beginning in the Breheimen mountains and emptying into the large river Gudbrandsdalslågen. The Otta River is known for rafting. The rafting season begins in mid-May and lasts until the end of September. The Norwegian National Road 15 runs along the river for almost its entire course.

Course
The river flows through the Billingsdalen valley heading to the east, including through several lakes including the Breiddalsvatnet, Skim, and Vågåvatn. After the Vågåvatn lake at Vågåmo, it enters the Ottadalen valley and heads to the southeast to the town of Otta in Sel Municipality. At Otta, the river joins the large river Gudbrandsdalslågen.

Name 
The name of the river is probably derived from the Old Norse verb ótta which means to "scare" or "terrify". The water of the river comes from glaciers, and the flooding of the river can be strong and fierce.

Media gallery

See also
List of rivers in Norway

References

Sel
Vågå
Lom, Norway
Skjåk
Rivers of Innlandet